"Bring a Little Lovin'" is a song written by Harry Vanda and George Young of the Australian rock group The Easybeats. The song was written for the Spanish band Los Bravos. Their version was released as a single in April 1968 and reached number fifty-one on the Billboard Hot 100 in the United States.

The Easybeats version was released later that year on the Australian version of their Vigil album. The Easybeats recording was originally a demo and was not released anywhere else in the world.

Track listing

Formats and track listings
7" single
"Bring a Little Lovin'" – 2:21
"Make It Last" – 2:39

Charts

In popular culture
On March 20, 2019, Los Bravos' version of "Bring a Little Lovin'" was featured on the soundtrack and first teaser trailer for Once Upon a Time in Hollywood, as well as the film itself, the ninth film directed by Quentin Tarantino.

Ricky Martin version

Ricky Martin recorded a Spanish-language version of "Bring a Little Lovin'", called "Dime Que Me Quieres" (English: "Say That You Love Me"). He included it on his debut solo album Ricky Martin, and released it as a single in 1992. A music video was also released.

Formats and track listings
Mexican promotional 12" maxi-single
"Dime Que Me Quieres (Bring a Little Lovin')" (Radio Mix) – 3:00
"Dime Que Me Quieres (Bring a Little Lovin')" (Dance Mix B/W) – 5:41
"Dime Que Me Quieres (Bring a Little Lovin')" (Dance Mix) – 5:41
"Dime Que Me Quieres (Bring a Little Lovin')" (Album Version) – 3:14

Brazilian promotional 12" single
"Diga Que Me Quere (Dime Que Me Quieres)" – 3:21

Charts

References

External links

1968 singles
1992 singles
Los Bravos songs
Ricky Martin songs
Songs written by Harry Vanda
Songs written by George Young (rock musician)
1968 songs
Albert Productions singles